Disulfur decafluoride is a chemical compound with the formula . It was discovered in 1934 by Denbigh and Whytlaw-Gray. Each sulfur atom of the  molecule is octahedral, and surrounded by five fluorine atoms and one sulfur atom. The two sulfur atoms are connected by a single bond. In the  molecule, the oxidation state of each sulfur atoms is +5, but their valency is 6 (they are hexavalent).  is highly toxic, with toxicity four times that of phosgene. 

It is a colorless liquid with a burnt match smell similar to sulfur dioxide.

Production
Disulfur decafluoride is produced by photolysis of :

Disulfur decafluoride arises by the decomposition of sulfur hexafluoride.

Properties
The S-S bond dissociation energy is 305 ± 21 kJ/mol, about 80 kJ/mol stronger than the S-S bond in diphenyldisulfide.

At temperatures above 150 °C,  decomposes slowly (disproportionation) into  and :
S2F10 → SF6 + SF4

  +  → 2 

In the presence of excess chlorine gas,  reacts to form sulfur chloride pentafluoride:

  +  → 2 

The analogous reaction with bromine is reversible and yields .

Ammonia is oxidised by  into .

Toxicity
 was considered a potential chemical warfare pulmonary agent in World War II because it does not produce lacrimation or skin irritation, thus providing little warning of exposure. 
Disulfur decafluoride is a colorless gas or liquid with a SO2-like odor. It is about four times as poisonous as phosgene.

See also
Phosgene
Perfluoroisobutene
Bis(trifluoromethyl) disulfide

References

External links
 

Pulmonary agents
Sulfur fluorides
Hypervalent molecules